Clare Valley is a town on the southwestern coast of Saint Vincent, in Saint Vincent and the Grenadines. It is located to the northwest of the capital, Kingstown, and southeast of Layou.

References
Scott, C. R. (ed.) (2005) Insight guide: Caribbean (5th edition). London: Apa Publications.

Populated places in Saint Vincent and the Grenadines